Banksula californica is a species of harvestman in family Phalangodidae. The animal is less than 2 mm in length.

Possible extinction 

The species is possibly extinct because the type locality, the place from where the type specimen of the species was collected, Alabaster Cave in El Dorado County, California, has been partially destroyed due to mining and has been sealed by concrete, making surveying impossible.

References
 
 
 

Harvestmen
Endemic fauna of California
Animals described in 1900
Fauna without expected TNC conservation status